The 2000 South African Figure Skating Championships were held in Cape Town on 3–7 October 1999. Skaters competed in the disciplines of men's and ladies' singles at the senior, novice, and pre-novice levels. There was also a junior and juvenile ladies' competition.

Senior results

Ladies

External links
 Results

South African Figure Skating Championships, 2000
South African Figure Skating Championships